The 1961 Copa de Campeones de América Finals was a football series between Peñarol and Palmeiras on June 4 and June 11 of this same year. It was the second final of South America's most prestigious football competition, the Copa de Campeones (known in the modern era as the Copa Libertadores). Defending champions Peñarol were appearing in their second consecutive final, whereas Palmeiras were seeking to win the competition for the first time. Both finalists reached the final with relative ease as each of them won three of their four matches.

Each club needed to win two group series to reach the final. Peñarol's victories were incredibly one-sided affairs, each effectively settled by the first leg, as they thumped Universitario of Peru 5-0 in the first leg of their quarterfinal group. Peñarol even dispatched Olimpia in the semifinals with little difficulty as they won both matches of the series in a rematch of the previous year's finals. Palmeiras made similar comfortable progress: they scored nine goals while conceding only three after beating Independiente away and crushing Independiente Santa Fe 4-1 at home.

Like the previous edition, Alberto Spencer scored a late goal in the first leg of the final to give his team a slight lead. Going into São Paulo, José Sasía scored in the first two minutes of the match in order to give Peñarol their second consecutive title in the competition. Sacia's goal also became the fastest goal to be scored on a final match. Curiously, José Luis Praddaude became the first, and so far only, referee to officiate both matches of the final series in this competition. He also refereed the second leg of the 1960 final.

Qualified teams

Stadiums

Rules
The final will be played over two legs; home and away. The team that accumulates the most points —two for a win, one for a draw, zero for a loss— after the two legs will be crowned the champion. Should the two teams be tied on points after the second leg, the team with the best goal difference will win. If the two teams have equal goal difference, a playoff match at a neutral venue will be contested.

Match details

First leg

Second leg

References

External links
CONMEBOL's official website 
Peñarol in Copa Libertadores 1960-1969
1961 Copa Libertadores at Ficha Do Jogo

1
1961
Peñarol matches
Sociedade Esportiva Palmeiras matches
1961 in Uruguayan football
Copa